Nesodon ("island tooth") is a genus of Miocene mammal belonging to the extinct order Notoungulata which inhabited southern South America during the Late Oligocene to Miocene living from 29.0 to 16.3 Ma and existed for approximately .
 It had a relatively large size, weighing up to 554 kg (1221 lbs) and reaching 1.5 m in height.

Taxonomy 
 
Nesodon was named by Owen (1846). It was assigned to Toxodontidae by Carroll (1988). It was an early member of the family Toxodontidae, which included the well-known Pleistocene genus Toxodon. Like almost all toxodontids, Nesodon was endemic to South America. In particular, fossils of Nesodon are known from late early Miocene (Santacrucian SALMA) deposits of Argentina and Chile.

Three species of Nesodon are recognized including a larger species, N. imbricatus, and a smaller species, N. conspurcatus. A poorly known and possibly invalid third species, N. cornutus, was similar to N. imbricatus but may have had a small horn on its head. All species of Nesodon were larger than species of the contemporary toxodontid Adinotherium.

The dentition of Nesodon shows features typical of living grazing (grass-eating) mammals, but a study of wear on the enamel of N. imbricatus suggests that it was a browser (leaf eater) that may have supplemented its diet with fruit or bark.

Classification 
 
In 2014, a study identifying a new species of Nesodon, N. taweretus, resolved the families phylogenetic relations, deriving the cladogram shown below:

Distribution 
Fossils of Nesodon have been found in:
 Deseado and Santa Cruz Formation, Argentina
 Chucal and Río Frías Formations, Chile

References

Bibliography 
 
 McKenna, Malcolm C., and Bell, Susan K. 1997. Classification of Mammals Above the Species Level. Columbia University Press, New York, 631 pp. 
 
 

Toxodonts
Prehistoric placental genera
Miocene mammals of South America
Friasian
Santacrucian
Colhuehuapian
Deseadan
Neogene Argentina
Fossils of Argentina
Neogene Chile
Fossils of Chile
Fossil taxa described in 1846
Taxa named by Richard Owen
Austral or Magallanes Basin
Santa Cruz Formation